Little Napoleon (Swedish: Lille Napoleon) is a 1943 Swedish comedy film directed by Gustaf Edgren and starring Åke Söderblom, Annalisa Ericson and Marianne Löfgren. It was shot at the Råsunda Studios in Stockholm. The film's sets were designed by the art director Nils Svenwall.

Synopsis
Lars is an insignificant office worker but one day is launched on a wave of success.

Cast
 Åke Söderblom as 	Lars Napoleon Larsson
 Annalisa Ericson as 	Lisa Larsson 
 Erik Berglund as 	Konrad Klint 
 Marianne Löfgren as Mrs. Klint
 Georg Funkquist as 	Lundkvist
 Gull Natorp as 	Aunt Anna
 Barbro Flodquist as 	Miss Mårtensson
 Thor Modéen as 	Staff Sergeant
 John Botvid as 	Strömberg
 Axel Högel as 	Blomkvist
 Carl Deurell as 	Selander
 Torsten Hillberg as 	Mellberg
 Kaj Hjelm as 	Kajan
 Julia Cæsar as 	Östermalm Lady 
 Margit Andelius as Miss Jönsson 
 Naemi Briese as Woman at the Party
 Anna-Lisa Baude as 	Woman at the Party

References

Bibliography 
 Qvist, Per Olov & von Bagh, Peter. Guide to the Cinema of Sweden and Finland. Greenwood Publishing Group, 2000.

External links 
 

1943 films
Swedish comedy films
1943 comedy films
1940s Swedish-language films
Films directed by Gustaf Edgren
1940s Swedish films